The list of shipwrecks in April 1834 includes ships sunk, foundered, wrecked, grounded or otherwise lost during April 1834.

1 April

5 April

6 April

8 April

9 April

10 April

11 April

16 April

18 April

24 April

25 April

26 April

27 April

28 April

29 April

30 April

Unknown date

References

1834-04